Jasper Newton "Jack" Smith (December 29, 1833 – August 16, 1918) was an American businessman from Georgia. Born in Walton County, he moved to Atlanta following the Civil War where he became a successful and eccentric businessman.

Early life and career 
Jasper Newton Smith was born in Walton County, Georgia on December 29, 1833 to William Smith and Elizabeth (Brady) Smith. Smith had nine brothers and two sisters. As a child, Jack developed a phobia of neckties due to an accidental near-strangulation, and as an adult he refused to ever wear one. He attended the public county school as a child and worked at his family's farm. At the start of the Civil War, Jack joined the Tenth Georgia Cavalry, but resigned in December 1864 due to an illness.

Shortly after the Civil War, Smith moved to Atlanta. In the city, which had been largely destroyed during the Burning of Atlanta, he established a brickyard near the intersection of Peachtree Street and Fourteenth Street in modern-day midtown Atlanta. He had purchased the 14 acres for approximately $100 per acre, with the brickyard producing over ten million bricks before Smith sold the property for a profit. Following this venture, Smith began investing in real estate in downtown Atlanta. By the late 1800s, "Uncle Jack", as he was commonly known in the city, was a successful businessman and prominent socialite. Among his properties was The Bachelor's Domain, a 44-room hotel where each room was called by one of the 44 states in the United States rather than by a room number.

In 1889, Smith built a large commercial building at the intersection of Peachtree Street and Forsyth Street. The building, called "The House That Jack Built", was constructed of granite blocks that had proven unusable for street paving purposes and adorned with marble slabs that had different phrases and sayings, including many Biblical verses. When Smith leased the building and property in 1909, he stipulated that the inscribed slabs should be displayed prominently in any future building or structure built on the property. When MARTA built the Peachtree Center station on the property in 1982, they relocated two of the slabs to a fenced-off area near the subway station entrance, where they still lie.

Later life and death 

Although Smith was an eccentric and odd man (historian Franklin Garrett referred to him as "an unusual man"), he became well-respected later in his life for his business acumen. He was often referred to as "Atlanta's quaintest character."

Smith died on August 16, 1918 in Atlanta. Several years prior to his death, Smith had commissioned the construction of a mausoleum in Oakland Cemetery, with a life-sized statue of himself accompanying it. According to one story, the sculptor Oliver W. Edwards had originally carved the statue with Smith wearing a necktie. However, Smith, who refused to wear neckties, refused to pay until the tie was removed from the sculpture. Despite Smith's well-documented dislike of neckties, the veracity of this story has been questioned, including by the daughter of the sculptor. Another story claims that when Smith became aware of a vine that had climbed the statue and wrapped itself around the statue's neck, he went to the cemetery and personally removed the vine. As one of the first statues built on the original 6 acres of the cemetery, he is sometimes referred to as the "Mayor of Oakland".

Notes

References

Bibliography 

 
 
 
 
 
 

1833 births
1918 deaths
19th-century American businesspeople
Businesspeople from Atlanta
American hoteliers
Burials at Oakland Cemetery (Atlanta)
People from Walton County, Georgia
American real estate businesspeople